#TamoEnVivoTour was a concert tour by Puerto Rican artist Daddy Yankee. The tour stated in Europe, becoming his first tour to perform in Europe since 2015`s King Daddy Tour, and move to Latin America. This is his first tour after his blockbuster collaboration. Despacito with Luis Fonsi

Tour dates

Box Office Data

Notes

References 

2017 concert tours
Concert tours of Canada
Concert tours of Mexico
Concert tours of the United States
Concert tours of South America
Concert tours of Europe
Concert tours of Asia
Daddy Yankee concert tours